The 1966 Iowa gubernatorial election was held on November 8, 1966. Incumbent Democrat Harold Hughes defeated Republican nominee William G. Murray with 55.34% of the vote.

Primary elections
Primary elections were held on September 6, 1966.

Democratic primary

Candidates
Harold Hughes, incumbent Governor

Results

Republican primary

Candidates
William G. Murray, Iowa State University Professor of Economics
Robert K. Beck, former State Representative

Results

General election

Candidates
Major party candidates
Harold Hughes, Democratic
William G. Murray, Republican 

Other candidates
David B. Quiner, Independent
Charles Sloca, Independent

Results

References

1966
Iowa
Gubernatorial
November 1966 events in the United States